Johannes Hermann Adrianus Cornelis de Mol (born August 12, 1963) is a Dutch diplomat. He is the current Ambassador of the Kingdom of the Netherlands in Ukraine.

Education 
Jennes de Mol finished his studies at the Radboud University in 1989, Greek and Latin Language and Culture, Classical Archaeology; 1994 Radboud University, Dutch Law and International Private Law. Language skills: Dutch, English, French, German, Italian, Russian, Ukrainian, Spanish.

Diplomatic career
After an extended military service he started in 1992 at the Ministry of Foreign Affairs and worked at the department for Africa, at the Embassy in Moscow and the Permanent Representation to the UN and other international organizations in Geneva.
He was Personnel and Management Advisor at the MFA (2003–05); Head department for Personnel and Management Advice (2005–08); He was Deputy Head of Mission Netherlands Embassy in Prague (2008-2010); Civilian Representative NATO Task Force VIII Uruzgan Afghanistan; Director of Provincial reconstruction Teams 8 and 9. He was Consul General in Saint Petersburg (2011–14); Assignment MH17 Kyiv (2014); He was Ambassador to the United Arab Emirates (2014–15); He was Director Human Resources Management at the MFA (2015–19); Since 2019 Ambassador to Ukraine.

References 

1963 births
Living people
21st-century Dutch diplomats
Radboud University Nijmegen alumni
Ambassadors of the Netherlands to Ukraine
Ambassadors of the Netherlands to the United Arab Emirates